The Bridge Inn (also known locally as the Pink Pub) is a Grade II listed public house at Bridge Hill, Topsham in the county of Devon, England. Mentioned as a dwelling in the 1086 Domesday Book, the building was largely constructed in the 18th century of cob and stone, with a 19th-century brick addition. Queen Elizabeth II visited the inn on 27 March 1998, her first official visit to a pub.

History
There have been people living at the site of Bridge Inn since at least 1086, as the dwelling was mentioned in the Doomsday Book. Parts of the present building date from the late 16th century, although the majority was built in the 18th century. It is built of cob with stone, although a later 19th-century addition is built of brick. The roof is slate throughout. Inside, there are three public rooms, one of which used to contain a brewery on-site. The interior includes many of the original 19th-century fixtures and fittings. It was designated Grade II listed status on 11 November 1952. The interior has been registered on the Campaign for Real Ale's National Inventory of Historic Pub Interiors. Inside, lager is only served in bottles, regular drinkers leave post-it notes on their favourite barrels of beer to be called when opened, and the pub will serve drinks by the third of a pint to allow for a wider variety of tasting.

The Bridge Inn has been a public house since at least 1797, when it included two dwellings, a quay and a salt refinery. The inn attracted wrestling competitions during the 19th century, and by 1900 there were cattle sales at the site.

In 1998, Queen Elizabeth II visited the Bridge Inn for its 101st anniversary, the first time she had officially visited a pub. There she was presented with a crate of commemorative ale, which she remarked that her husband, Prince Philip, Duke of Edinburgh, would enjoy. In 2008, for the pub's 111th anniversary, the same commemorative ale was brewed for a third time at Branscombe Vale Brewery, with a crate graciously received by Buckingham Palace. Coincidentally, at the same time, an invitation was sent to the pub for attendance at an event at the palace. The Queen remarked that she "couldn’t believe 10 years had passed since her visit."

As of 2014, the inn has remained in the hands of the same family for more than a century, and is now available as a wedding venue.

References

Topsham, Bridge Inn
National Inventory Pubs